Pickerel Lake is a lake in Hubbard County, in the U.S. state of Minnesota.

Pickerel Lake was named for its stock of the pickerel fish.

See also
List of lakes in Minnesota

References

Lakes of Minnesota
Lakes of Hubbard County, Minnesota